David A. Capp (born January 18, 1950) is an American attorney who served as the United States Attorney for the Northern District of Indiana from 2007 to 2017.

Capp resigned his post shortly before his retirement "as requested by the President."

See also
2017 dismissal of U.S. attorneys

References

External links
 Former U.S. Attorney David Capp: 'They were crooks and corrupt politicians'

1950 births
Living people
United States Attorneys for the Northern District of Indiana
Indiana Democrats
Assistant United States Attorneys
University of Wisconsin–Madison alumni
Valparaiso University School of Law alumni
Indiana lawyers